"Blowing Smoke" is the twelfth episode of the fourth season of the American television drama series Mad Men, and the 51st overall episode of the series. It aired on the AMC channel in the United States on October 10, 2010. At the 63rd Primetime Emmy Awards, Robert Morse was nominated for the Primetime Emmy Award for Outstanding Guest Actor in a Drama Series for his performance in this episode; Andre and Maria Jaccquemetton were nominated for the Primetime Emmy Award for Outstanding Writing for a Drama Series for their teleplay.

Plot
Don Draper meets with a representative from Heinz to discuss moving the beans, vinegars, and sauces line of business to Sterling Cooper Draper Pryce but is dismayed when the potential client says he will hear ideas from SCDP in six to eight months, as he has doubts about the agency's immediate future. Don, pushing to clinch the business sooner, offers to reduce the commission, but the client declines. He advises Don to leave selling to the accounts professionals. 

At the office, the partners talk with an advisor, Geoffrey Atherton (Faye Miller's business partner), who recommends they replace Lucky Strike with new business immediately to avoid being seen as stagnant or decaying, preferably another tobacco account. Atherton arranges for SCDP a meeting with Philip Morris and SCDP; however, Philip Morris cancels on the day of the appointment, having only scheduled a meeting with SCDP to exert pricing leverage with their existing agency Leo Burnett Worldwide.

Lane extends the agency's bank loan to bridge the loss of Lucky Strike revenues. He asks the partners to collateralize the line of credit, with an investment of $100,000 from each senior partner, and $50,000 from each junior partner.

Pete tells Lane he can't afford the investment and applies for a loan of his own. When Trudy learns of the ad agency's financial troubles, she forbids Pete to borrow the sum from the bank or her father.

Don runs into his ex-girlfriend, Midge Daniels (Rosemarie DeWitt) in the Time-Life Building lobby; she says she was there for a business meeting and acts surprised to see Don. Midge invites Don home for dinner and introduces him to her husband, Harry, who inadvertently reveals that Midge had tracked Don down. Midge confesses that she and her husband are heroin addicts, and that Harry will use Don's money for drugs. Don gives Midge a check for $300, and $120 in cash. Don spurns her advances and, once home, Don starts to throw the painting out. However, he instead ends up staring at it all night.  
 
Without consulting the other partners, Don writes a letter, which he places as a full-page ad in The New York Times, to publicly say that he is relieved to no longer be advertising a fatal and addictive product like tobacco. The other partners are livid, and an angry Cooper abruptly resigns. After Lane assesses the firm's financial status, the partners agree to dismiss most of the staff, as the firm's dwindling funds are insufficient to make another payroll unless they downsize.

Don meets with Peggy, and tells her to approve a list of the people in the Creative Department who need to be dismissed. In the midst of the firings, SCDP receives a call from the American Cancer Society, inquiring about launching an anti-cigarette campaign. Pete is unimpressed, as the work is pro bono, but the other partners point out the client is prestigious, and that many of the society's board members are bigwigs and potential new clients.

Faye informs Don that she and Atherton must resign SCDP's business, because Atherton wants to continue working with tobacco clients. However, she and Don can now date openly, which she considers a fair trade. 

Dr. Edna tells Betty that Sally has made excellent progress and will now see her only once a week. This dismays Betty, who claims Sally's life remains chaotic. Dr. Edna refers Betty to a fellow psychiatrist, but is persuaded to reserve time "to continue discussing Sally's progress", instead. Later, Betty is angered to learn that Sally and Glen have been talking in private. At the dinner table, Betty suggests to Henry that they move to another town, and Henry agrees. Sally runs up to her room, heartbroken.

Cultural references
 The title refers, at once, three concepts:
The act of smoking, which corresponds to the firm's chasing tobacco clients as well as the numerous characters' continuing to light up 
The haze of romance through which the episode viewed the agency's work situation
Saying things that are untrue in order to make oneself or something one's involved in seem better than it is. Time magazine's TV critic, James Poniewozik, devoted his review to the many examples of this behavior throughout the episode.
 Sally Draper describes to Glen Bishop the infinite-loop motif, or Droste effect, on the Land O'Lakes butter packaging, which features an Indigenous woman holding the butter box.
The morning Don's anti-tobacco letter appears in The New York Times, Megan Calvet informs him he has received a phone call from Emerson Foote. Alan Sepinwall observes: "one of Don's other phone messages was from Emerson Foote, an advertising giant who in 1965 quit his job as chairman of McCann-Erickson because he didn't want to represent tobacco anymore", and who, as Keith Phipps observes: "devoted himself to anti-smoking advocacy. (He later came back.) Foote was of the generation before Don's and, unlike Don, he hated the cigarette industry in earnest."
Don invites Faye to dinner at La Caravelle, an "august" French restaurant that - along with Le Pavillon, and La Côte Basque, was an offshoot "of the seminal restaurant in the French pavilion of the 1939 New York World's Fair, where [Charles] Masson père began as a waiter under the eye of the legendary Henri Soulé".

Reception
Viewership for "Blowing Smoke" rose from the previous episode as 2.23 million viewers tuned in on the night of the original airing, while 0.7 million viewers in the adults 18-49 age demographic watched the episode.

References

External links
 "Blowing Smoke" at AMC
 

Mad Men (season 4) episodes
2010 American television episodes